Łękawica may refer to the following places:
Łękawica, Tarnów County in Lesser Poland Voivodeship (south Poland)
Łękawica, Wadowice County in Lesser Poland Voivodeship (south Poland)
Łękawica, Kozienice County in Masovian Voivodeship (east-central Poland)
Łękawica, Mińsk County in Masovian Voivodeship (east-central Poland)
Łękawica, Silesian Voivodeship (south Poland)